Anand Lok, Kalwar Road, Jaipur is a newly developed colony on the west outskirts of Jaipur. It is on Kalwar Road, Jaipur just 4 km ahead of Sushant city. Its total area is around 37 acres. 

The colony was built by urban developer Ansal API from 2006 to 2010.

Nearby colonies
Nearby colonies are Sushant City, Jaipur, Kalwad, Global City, Anand Lok Extension, Sukh Sagar Enclave, Jaipur, Govindpura, Ganesh Nagar Extn, Amrit Kunj Residential Scheme, and Jaipur. 

The nearest Jaipur metro station is Ambabari Metro Station which is 16.5 km, Pani Pech Station & Subhash Nagar Station on Orange Metro Line.

Sambhar Salt Lake is India's largest inland salt lake to the 52.4 km west of Anand Lok, Kalwar Road, Jaipur.

Nearest schools/colleges
 Spring Dales School, Sushant city
 Biyani Engineering College Jaipur
 Sri Kalyan World School
 Global International Academy
 M P S
 Vedanta International School

Distance from basic amenities
 Airport: 32.0 km
 Main Jaipur Railway Station: 21.0 km
 City center: 18.0 km

Rail stations
 Dhankya Railway Rail Station, 7.0 km - 10 mins drive
 Kanakpura Railway Station, 14.0 km - 19 mins drive
 Dher Ka Balaji Rail Station,16.6 km - 20 mins drive
 Jaipur Railway Rail Station, 20.5 km - 27 mins drive
 Nindar Benard Rail Station, 17.3 km - 28 mins drive
 Bais Godam Rail Station, 25.0 km - 32 mins drive

References

External links
 Google maps
 Plots in Kalwad Road

Neighbourhoods in Jaipur